Aelfrida Catharine Wetenhall Tillyard (5 October 1883 – 12 December 1959) was a British author, medium, lecturer on Comparative Religion and associated religious topics, spiritual advisor and self-styled mystic.

Early life
Tillyard was born in Cambridge as the second child and only daughter of local newspaper proprietor/editor Alfred Isaac Tillyard MA and his wife Catharine Sarah née Wetenhall, proponent of higher education for women. Her mother was one of the first women to take the Higher Local Examination after attending lectures for women in Cambridge. Tillyard had three brothers, one of whom predeceased her; Henry Julius Wetenhall Tillyard (1881-1968), classicist and expert in Byzantine Musicology, Conrad Francis Wetenhall Tillyard (1885-1888) and Eustace Mandeville Wetenhall Tillyard (1889-1961), active in English Literature studies and Master of Jesus College, Cambridge. Events surrounding the untimely death of Conrad Francis traumatised Tillyard so deeply that her personality became severely dysfunctional. Unable to tolerate formal schooling, she was educated privately by Cambridge lecturers until 1900, after which she spent a year in Switzerland and several months in Florence to perfect her already-fluent French and Latin. She subsequently taught languages at Cambridge schools but she wanted to write. A breakdown in her physical and mental health ended the teaching career envisaged by her parents.

Later life
During her stormy adolescence, Tillyard underwent several mystico-religious experiences as a result of which she decided to dedicate her life to God's service. Bizarre manifestations of her dedication persuaded her parents that marriage was the only means of normalising her. On 19 January 1907 Tillyard reluctantly married Greco-American Constantine Cleanthes Graham (born Michaelides); they had two daughters, Elizabeth Mary Alethea in 1908 and Aelfrida Catharine Agatha in 1910. From 1907 until 1914 the Grahams lived in Russia, the United States, Germany and France as Constantine's Consular Service career dictated. After 1910 Tillyard and the children remained in Cambridge. During the war and thereafter Tillyard claimed to experience unwanted and sometimes unwelcome visits from dead persons known to or hitherto unknown by her; these included members of her family, former members of the Society for Psychical Research, Rupert Brooke and Roger Casement. Already under strain because of Constantine's infidelities and Tillyard's moral and religious obsessions, the Grahams' marriage broke down irretrievably following her brief but influential foray into esotericism under the guidance of occultist Aleister Crowley in 1913.

Her compulsion to reveal marital discord and her own extramarital relationships in anthologies published in 1910, 1913 and 1916 also contributed to the failure of her marriage. The Grahams divorced in 1921. Constantine's consular career kept him abroad thereafter until his death in Berlin in 1934. Unlike her former husband, Tillyard never remarried but continued a series of intense friendships with younger men begun during her marriage, most notably with Ernest Altounyan, Hubert Henderson, Thomas Henn, John Layard, Juan Mascaro and Giovanni Papini. She also conducted one such friendship with a younger woman and one with the older French author Albert Erlande.

Work
In 1917 Tillyard came out as a mystic. Having already begun to record her mystico-spiritual experiences and their psychophysical manifestations in detailed diaries intended for posthumous publication, she also began to transcribe them in more or less fictionalised form in novels, homiletic books and moralistic short stories written between 1917 and 1958, some published, some not. In 1926 she wrote a biography of her aunt, Agnes Elizabeth Slack who campaigned for temperance. She documenting her aunt's travels to speak about temperance in Ireland, Canada, America, Scandinavia and South Africa.

Following Alfred and Catharine Tillyard's respective deaths in 1929 and 1932, she decided to absolve herself of responsibility for her home and daughters in order to pursue her private and personal 'mystic way'. She was nevertheless dismayed when her daughters abandoned her, Alethea by becoming a nun and missionary, Agatha by suicide. In pursuit of her 'closer walk with God' Tillyard also became an Anglo-Catholic and (briefly) an extern oblate of St Mary's Abbey, West Malling, Kent.

Tillyard wrote two science fiction novels articulating her conservative political views. Concrete: A Story of Two Hundred Years Hence (1930) is set in an anti-religious dystopia controlled by the eugenics movement. The novel includes a character called "Big Brother" who leads a "Ministry of Reason" and there is also a propaganda department called the "Ministry of Aesthetics". The Approaching Storm (1932) is another dystopia set in a Britain ruled by a left-wing dictatorship.

In 1934 she moved to Oxford to live an anchoritic life in a small house attached to the Convent of St Thomas the Martyr but a serious physical and mental breakdown in 1936 forced her to move to the protective environment afforded by the Society of the Sacred Cross at Tymawr Convent near Monmouth. She remained there as resident tertiary until asked to leave in 1946. From 1946 to 1953 she lived a semi-reclusive and prayerful but troubled life in two clergy houses in Cambridgeshire, effected a degree of rapprochement with her surviving daughter, and enjoyed a close relationship with her elder brother.

In 1953 increasing bodily infirmity forced a move to St John's Home in Oxford where she died 6 acrimonious years later. She bequeathed her notebooks, published and unpublished works, and 75 volumes of diaries to Girton College, Cambridge, of which her daughters were alumnae. The diaries were sealed until 2005.

Published works

 Le Livre des Jeux (Blackie & Co London) 1906
 To Malise (Heffer & Sons Cambridge) 1910
 Cambridge Poets 1900-1913 (Heffer & Sons Cambridge) 1913
 Bammie's Book (Heffer & Sons Cambridge) 1915
 The Garden and the Fire (Heffer & Sons Cambridge) 1916
 The Making of a Mystic (Heffer & Sons Cambridge) 1917
 Vision Triumphant (James Clarke & Co London) 1919
 Verses for Alethea (Heffer & Sons Cambridge) 1920
 A Little Road-Book for Mystics (Faith Press London)  1922. Second edition (SCM Press London) 1931
 Messages (Faith Press London) 1924
 Agnes E. Slack (Heffer & Sons Cambridge) 1926
 Spiritual Exercises (SPCK London) 1927
 The Young Milliner (Hutchinson & Co London) 1929
 The Way We Grow Up (Hutchinson & Co London) 1929
 Can I Be a Mystic? (Rider & Co London) 1930
 Concrete (Hutchinson & Co London) 1930
 Haste to the Wedding (Hutchinson & Co London) 1931
 The Approaching Storm (Hutchinson & Co London) 1932
 The Closer Walk with God (SPCK London) 1935
 The Way of Praise (SPCK London) 1937
 The Night Watches (Faith Press London) 1938
 Memory Pictures (The Watchword) 1953-1958
 The Fruits of Silence (British Publishing Co Gloucester) 1949
 The Silence of God (British Publishing Co Gloucester) 1950

References

Further reading

 Mann, S. Aelfrida Tillyard: Hints of a Perfect Splendour (biography)(Wayment P&P Cambridge) 2013
 Albinski, N. Women's Utopias in British & American Fiction (Routledge London) 1988
 Crowley, A. The Paris Working (Thelema Publishing Co Nashville USA)1981
 Hort, G. Sense & Thought (Allen & Unwin London) 1936
 Kaczynski, R. Perdurabo (North Atlantic Books Berkeley Calif) 2010
 Laver, J. Museum Piece (A. Deutch London)1963
 Parke, S. Church Times 11 April 2008 & 5 March 2010
 Slonczewski, J. Still Forms on Foxfield (Ballantine Books New York) 1980
 Symonds, J. The Magic of Aleister Crowley (F. Muller London) 1958
 Yelton, M. Outposts of the Faith (Canterbury Press Norwich) 2009

External links 
 Tillyard information
 

1883 births
1959 deaths
20th-century English novelists
20th-century British women writers
English science fiction writers
English spiritual mediums
Parapsychologists
Women science fiction and fantasy writers